Seebach is a commune in the Bas-Rhin department in Grand Est in north-eastern France. It was formed in 1974 by the merger of the former communes Oberseebach and Niederseebach.

Timber framed houses in Seebach

See also
 Communes of the Bas-Rhin department

References

External links

Communes of Bas-Rhin
Bas-Rhin communes articles needing translation from French Wikipedia